Los Madriles was a weekly magazine illustrated in colour. Published in Madrid between October 1888 and July 1890, for a total of 65 issues, its first editor was Federico Urrecha, who was followed by the noted journalist, playwright and lyricist Eduardo Navarro Gonzalvo.

Collaborators included leading writers and journalists of the day, such as Leopoldo Alas (Clarín), Emilio Bobadilla (Fray Candil), Manuel Paso, José María de Pereda, Jacinto Octavio Picón, Eduardo Lustonó, and Carlos Fernández Shaw as well as the major illustrators and cartoonists of the day, including Ramón Cilla and Ángel Pons.

See also
 List of magazines in Spain

References

1888 establishments in Spain
1890 disestablishments in Spain
Defunct magazines published in Spain
Satirical magazines published in Spain
Magazines established in 1888
Magazines disestablished in 1890
Comics magazines published in Spain
Spanish humour
Weekly magazines published in Spain
Magazines published in Madrid